Vuurbaken is a hamlet  in the Dutch province of South Holland and is part of the municipality of Hoeksche Waard. It lies to the south of Oud-Beijerland and about 1 km from Zinkweg.
 
Vuurbaken is not a statistical entity, and considered part of Oud-Beijerland and Nieuw-Beijerland. It has no place name signs, and consists of about 30 houses.

References

Populated places in South Holland
Hoeksche Waard